Chenta Tsai Tseng, better known as Putochinomaricón, is a Spanish-Taiwanese musician. They began in the Spanish alternative music scene in 2018. Their name was created from the insults they would be referred to on the streets. They released their debut album Jájá Équisdé in 2022, which was described as an album of "relief after only knowing resistance".

Themes 
Their early singles "Gente de Mierda" and "El Test de la Bravo y la Superpop" associated them with the hyperpop genre. Their music has also been associated with the related glitchcore genre. They cited A-Mei as an influence for them as an East Asian and Taiwanese pop artist and GFOTY as someone they have looked up to as an experimental artist.

Their music has influenced discussions on decolonized dance music, being referred to by The Line of Best Fit as using pop for "fictional speculation and political resistance". On the subject of decolonization in their music, Tseng states "That was a game changer for me. I suddenly realised I am talking about the colonisation of our bodies and identities, but it was hypocritical of me to go back to my living room and use Ableton, where you open it and it has a tuning system that is Western, it marks a four-by-four rhythm. I wanted to use this DAW in the most incorrect way possible."

Discography 
Mini albums

 Corazón de Cerdo Con Ginseng al Vapor (2018)
 Miseria Humana (2019)

Albums

References 

Spanish pop musicians
Queer artists
Living people
Spanish LGBT musicians
Year of birth missing (living people)
Hyperpop musicians